James Howard (born November 16, 1969) is an American basketball coach who is currently the head women's basketball coach at Georgetown University, a role he has held since 2017.

Career
A native of Washington, D.C., he has spent the majority of his coaching career in the Washington metropolitan area.

Head coaching record

References

External links 
 
 Georgetown Hoyas profile

1969 births
Living people
Basketball coaches from Washington, D.C.
Greensboro Pride men's basketball coaches
Wesley Wolverines men's basketball coaches
Wesley Wolverines women's basketball coaches
Georgetown Hoyas women's basketball coaches
Maryland Terrapins women's basketball coaches
George Mason Patriots women's basketball coaches
Delaware State Hornets women's basketball coaches
Howard Bison women's basketball coaches
Bethune–Cookman Wildcats women's basketball coaches